The 1992 USAC FF2000 Western Division Championship was the third season of the series. It was the first season since the east/west split of the series by the United States Auto Club. Greg Moore won the series championship for Team Viper in a Swift DB-6

Race calendar and results

Notes

Final standings

References

U.S. F2000 National Championship seasons
1992 in American motorsport